CBHC may refer to:

Canadian Bushplane Heritage Centre
Campaign for Better Health Care
Royal Commission on the Ancient and Historical Monuments of Wales, abbreviated CBHC in Welsh